Settle is a surname, and may refer to:

 Alf Settle (1912–1988), British professional footballer 
 Alison Settle (1891–1980), British fashion journalist and editor
 Amber Settle, American computer scientist and education academic
 Benjamin Hale Settle (born 1947), American judge
 Elkanah Settle (1648–1724), English poet and playwright
 Evan E. Settle (1848–1899), American politician from Kentucky
 Henry Settle (1847–1923), British Army officer 
 Jimmy Settle (1875–1954), English footballer 
 John Settle (born 1965), American football player and coach
 Josiah T. Settle (1850–1915), American lawyer 
 Keala Settle (born 1975), American actress and singer
 Martha Settle Putney (1916–2008), American educator and historian
 Mary Lee Settle (1918–2005), American writer 
 Matthew Settle (b. 1969), American actor
 Michaela Settle (born 1964), Australian politician 
 Mike Settle (born 1941), American musician and journalist 
 Thomas Settle (North Carolina, 15th–16th Congress) (1789–1857), American politician, U.S. Representative from North Carolina from 1817–1821
 Thomas Settle (judge) (1831–1888), American judge and politician in North Carolina
 Thomas Settle (North Carolina, 53rd–54th Congress) (1865–1919), American politician, U.S. Representative from North Carolina from 1893–1897
 Thomas G. W. Settle (1895–1980), United States Navy officer
 Tim Settle (born 1997), American football defensive tackle
 Will Settle, English football manager

See also
 Settles